"Rise Up 2.0" is a single by New Zealand rock band Six60. It was released as on 30 August 2010 as the lead single from their self-titled debut studio album. It reached number 1 on the New Zealand Singles Chart

Chart performance
"Rise Up 2.0" debuted on the RIANZ charts at number five and dropped out of the top 40 after three weeks. It later re-entered the charts at number 26 before peaking at number one.

Music video
The music video for "Rise Up 2.0" was directed by Greg Page and set at an arm wrestling competition. While the competitors are challenging each other, Six60 perform the song behind a metal fence.

Track listing
Digital single
"Rise Up 2.0" – 4:08

Digital EP
"Rise Up 2.0" – 4:08
"Rise Up 2.0" (Mount Eden Dubstep Remix) – 4:37
"Rise Up 2.0" (Tony B Remix) – 5:50

Charts

References

2010 singles
Six60 songs
Number-one singles in New Zealand
2010 songs